Richard D. Alba (born December 22, 1942) is an American sociologist, who is a Distinguished Professor at the Graduate Center, CUNY. He is known for developing assimilation theory to fit the contemporary, multi-racial era of immigration, with studies in America, France and Germany.

Alba grew up in New York City, where he attended the Bronx High School of Science, followed by undergraduate and graduate training at Columbia University, where he earned his B.A. in 1963 and Ph.D. in 1974.

Alba's text on assimilation theory (written with Victor Nee), Remaking the American Mainstream (2003) won the Thomas & Znaniecki Award of the American Sociological Association and the Eastern Sociological Society’s Mirra Komarovsky Award. It was the 36th most-cited work in sociology between 2008 and 2012.

Alba has also written about the historical realities of assimilation, using Italian Americans to exemplify them.  His book, Ethnic Identity:  The Transformation of White America (1990), summarizes his thinking on the assimilation of the so-called white ethnics.  His Blurring the Color Line: The New Chance for a More Integrated America (2009) applied these ideas to non-white Americans.

In 2001 Alba was elected Vice President of the American Sociological Association. In 1997 and 1998 he was President of the Eastern Sociological Society.

From 2012 to 2013, he was President of the Sociological Research Association.  He has received the Distinguished Career Award from the International Migration section of the American Sociological Association and the Merit Award of the Eastern Sociological Society.  He has been awarded a John Simon Guggenheim Fellowship, two Fulbright grants, and fellowships from the German Marshall Fund, and the Russell Sage Foundation.
He is a fellow of the Radcliffe Institute.

Bibliography

Notes

References 
 2007 Curriculum Vitae for Richard Alba

1942 births
Living people
American sociologists
Graduate Center, CUNY faculty
Members of the United States National Academy of Sciences
Columbia College (New York) alumni
Columbia Graduate School of Arts and Sciences alumni